This list is of the Cultural Properties of Japan designated in the category of  for the Circuit of '''Hokkaidō.

National Cultural Properties
As of 1 July 2019, zero properties have been designated as being of national significance.

Prefectural Cultural Properties
As of 1 July 2019, five properties have been designated at a prefectural level.

Municipal Cultural Properties
Properties designated at a municipal level include:

See also
 Cultural Properties of Japan
 List of National Treasures of Japan (paintings)
 Japanese painting
 Ainu genre painting

References

External links
  Cultural Properties in Hokkaido

Cultural Properties,Hokkaidō
Paintings,Hokkaidō
Lists of paintings